National economy may refer to:
Economy of a particular country
The type of economy desired by economic nationalism
National economy (Germany), theory developed by Friedrich List
National economy (Turkey)